Backlight (Portuguese: Contraluz) is a 2010 Portuguese–American mystery and action drama film directed by Fernando Fragata. It stars Joaquim de Almeida, Evelina Pereira, and Scott Bailey.

Backlight was the second highest-grossing Portuguese film in 2010.

Cast
 Joaquim de Almeida – Jay
 Evelina Pereira – Helena
 Scott Bailey – Matt
 Michelle Mania – Lucy's mother
 Skyler Day – Lucy
 Joseph Hagler (as Joey Hagler) – Daniel
 Donovan Scott – Old farmer
 Ana Cristina de Oliveira – Motel Receptionist

References

External links
 

2010 films
2010 action drama films
American action drama films
Portuguese action films
2010s mystery films
English-language Portuguese films
Portuguese-language films
2010s English-language films
2010s American films